The San Bernardino Transit Center (Metrolink designation San Bernardino–Downtown) is an intermodal transit center in downtown San Bernardino, California, United States. It is owned and operated by Omnitrans, the area's public transportation agency. Opened in September 2015, the center consolidates two Metrolink commuter rail routes, the Arrow rail route, and more than a dozen local bus services, including the sbX bus rapid transit line into one central location.

History and development 

Pacific Electric (PE) and its local predecessors used the SBTC site as a tram shed in the early 1900s, and later Upland–San Bernardino Line trains terminated here. Omnitrans selected the site at the corner of West Rialto Avenue and South E Street to build a transit center in the 2000s, and purchased the land for the station from Union Pacific Railroad, the successor corporation to Pacific Electric, in 2008. In 2010, San Bernardino Associated Governments, the area regional planning organization had stepped into to fund and coordinate the project and hired design firm HDR, Inc. to draw up plans for the transit center.

Construction of the center began in 2014, with a groundbreaking held on February 25. The sbX line and its adjacent station on E Street opened on April 28, 2014.

The transit center was complete by August 24, 2015, when a celebration was held at the site, but it didn't open for service until September 8, 2015, coinciding with a major service change for Omnitrans, which saw more than a dozen bus lines rerouted to serve the transit center.

Train service came to the station in late 2017 after the completion of a project that built tracks between the transit center and San Bernardino's Santa Fe Depot, which was the city's primary train depot. Test runs of the train service to downtown with paying passengers began on December 16, 2017, with the service officially being declared open on December 18.

Arrow, a hybrid rail route (light rail with some features similar to commuter rail), opened on October 24, 2022, with its western terminus at the transit center. At the same time, the daily express trip on Metrolink's San Bernardino Line was extended to  station. Express trains pass through the transit center without stopping.

The California High-Speed Rail Authority is considering the station as a possible stop on the second phase of the California High-Speed Rail project.

Services and facilities 

The center contains a LEED Gold station building with public facilities, waiting areas, and solar panels on its roof. A mural titled Explorations is on the exterior of the station building, and a large sundial is at the center of the bus area.

The central bus plaza has 19 bus bays, with two additional bus bays located along West Rialto Avenue which runs along the northern edge of the transit center, and the sbX bus rapid transit platform in the median of South E Street which runs along the eastern edge of the transit center.

Rail services 
A total of four train tracks are located along the southern edge of the transit center, served by two side platforms and one island platform. The Arrow service uses the two tracks closest to the central bus plaza, which continue across South E Street to Redlands. Metrolink trains use all four tracks, including the two southernmost stub-end tracks, where trains can be stored for extended periods of time without blocking the main line.

Bus services 
 the following transit bus routes serve the San Bernardino Transit Center:
 Omnitrans: 1, 2, 3, 4, 6, 8, 10, 14, 15, 215, 290, 
 Beaumont Transit: 
 Mountain Transit: , 
 Riverside Transit Agency: 
 SunLine Transit Agency: 
 Victor Valley Transit Authority: 15

The station is also served by the intercity bus company FlixBus which operates routes to Las Vegas, Phoenix-Tempe, San Diego, and Ventura from the transit center.

References

External links 

 San Bernardino Transit Center at the HDR, Inc. website
 San Bernardino Transit Center at the U.S. Green Building Council website
 San Bernardino Transit Center at the VVTA website
 Transfer Centers at the Omnitrans website

Bus stations in San Bernardino County, California
Buildings and structures in San Bernardino, California
Transportation in San Bernardino, California
2015 establishments in California
Transport infrastructure completed in 2015
Metrolink stations in San Bernardino County, California
Railway stations in the United States opened in 2017
2017 establishments in California
Transit centers in the United States
Proposed California High-Speed Rail stations
Arrow stations